The De Legibus (On the Laws) is a dialogue written by Marcus Tullius Cicero during the last years of the Roman Republic.  It bears the same name as Plato's famous dialogue, The Laws. Unlike his previous work De re publica, in which Cicero felt compelled to set the action in the times of Scipio Africanus Minor, Cicero wrote this work as a fictionalized dialogue between himself, his brother Quintus, and their mutual friend Titus Pomponius Atticus. 
The dialogue begins with the trio taking a leisurely stroll through Cicero's familial estate at Arpinum and they begin to discuss how the laws should be. Cicero uses this as a platform for expounding on his theories of natural law of harmony among the classes.

The three surviving books (out of an indeterminate number, although Jonathan Powell and Niall Rudd in their translation for Oxford seem to argue that it may have been six, to bring it in line with the number in de re publica), in order, expound on Cicero's beliefs in Natural Law, recasts the religious laws of Rome (in reality a rollback to the religious laws under the king Numa Pompilius) and finally talk of his proposed reforms to the Roman Constitution.

Whether or not the work was meant as an earnest plan of action is unknown. Cicero's basic conservative and traditionalist beliefs led him to imagine an idealized Rome before the Gracchi, with the classes still in harmony. From there, he reformed the worst points of the Roman constitution, while keeping the majority of it. Cicero's proposed constitution in Book Three must be seen as a renovation of the existing order, not a call to shatter the order and build anew. However, less than a decade after the accepted date for his beginning the manuscript, Julius Caesar crossed the Rubicon, launching the civil war that would end the Republic.

Book One 
The book opens with Cicero, Quintus and Atticus walking through the shaded groves at Cicero's Arpinum estate, when they happen across an old oak tree linked by legend to the general and consul Gaius Marius, who also was a native of Arpinum. Atticus questions whether or not it still exists, to which Quintus replies that so long as people remember the spot and the associations connected with it, the tree will exist regardless of its physical presence. This brings the trio into a discussion of the porous border between fact and fable in historians' writing of the day. Cicero lets on that even in their day, many of the stories of the Roman kings, such as Numa Pompilius conversing with the nymph Egeria, were thought of as fables or parables rather than as actual incidents which happened.

Atticus takes the opportunity to prod Cicero to starting a promised work on Roman history (if such a work existed, it has not surfaced to any extent in modern times) and flatters him by pointing out that in any case, Cicero may be one of the more qualified men in Rome to do it, given the numerous flaws of Roman historians of the era. Cicero begs off, mentioning that he has his hands full with studying the law in preparation for cases. This brings us to the meat of the book, an exposition of the wellspring of the law. Atticus, as a divertissement, asks Cicero to put some of his knowledge to use right then and there and give them a discussion on the law as they walk across his estate.

To Cicero, law was not a matter of written statutes, and lists of regulations, but was a matter deeply ingrained in the human spirit, one that was an integral part of the human experience.

His reasoning goes thus:
 Humans were created by a higher power or powers (and for the sake of argument, Cicero has the Epicurean Atticus concede the point that this higher power is engaged with the affairs of humanity).
This higher power which created the universe did, for reasons known to itself, endow humans with a bit of its own divinity, giving the human race the powers of speech, reason, and thought.
Due to this spark of divinity inside humans, they must de facto be related to the higher power in some fashion.
Because humans share reason with the higher power, and because this higher power is presumed to be benevolent, it follows that humans, when employing reason correctly, will likewise be benevolent.
This reason is what Cicero considers the law. To him, the law is whatever promotes good and forbids evil. What holds us back from upholding this absolutely is our human failings, our lusts for pleasure, wealth, status, other inconsequentials outside of virtue and honor.

Book Two 

Book Two begins with Cicero espousing his beliefs on Natural Law. The party has made it to an island in the river Fibrenius where they sit and relax and resume their discussion. As the book begins, Cicero and Atticus argue about whether a person can hold patriotism for both one's larger country and the region therein that one hails from: i.e., can one love Rome and Arpinum at the same time? Cicero argues that not only can one, but it is natural. Cicero uses the example of Cato the Elder, who by dint of his birth in Tusculum was a Roman citizen yet could, with no hypocrisy, also call himself a Tuscan. However, Cicero also makes the important distinction that one's birthplace must take subordination to the land of one's citizenship—that there is where one's duty is owed to and for which one must, if necessary, lay down one's life. Cicero also strengthens the link between him and Gaius Marius by having Atticus mention a speech by Pompey, who talked of Rome's debt to Arpinum, as its two greatest sons were also Rome's saviors.

Once the trio reach the island, Cicero launches into an examination of law. He begins by saying that law does not, and cannot, begin with men. Men, to him, are the instruments of a higher wisdom which governs the entire earth and has the power, through shared morality, to command good or forbid evil. Cicero also makes a distinction in this section between legalism (actual written law) and law (right and wrong as dictated by the eternal wisdom). To Cicero, human laws can be good or ill depending on whether they are in sync with the eternal, natural law. A law enacted for a purely temporary or local purpose is law, according to him, by dint of public approval. It has force of law only so long as people observe it and the state enforces it. Natural law, however, needs no encoding, no enforcement. By way of example, Cicero mentions that when Sextus Tarquinius, son of King Lucius Tarquinius Superbus, raped Lucretia, there were no laws in Rome governing rape. However, even then, the populace knew viscerally that what had happened was against shared morality, and followed Lucius Junius Brutus to overthrow the Tarquins. Evil laws, or ones that go against the eternal law, further, do not deserve the title, and states that enact them to the exclusion of the eternal law do not deserve the title states. To demonstrate, Cicero uses the analogy of unschooled people or quacks passing themselves off as doctors and prescribing deadly treatments. No one in their right mind, Cicero argues, would dare call such treatments "medicine" or their practitioners "doctors".

Cicero's insistence that religious belief (the belief in the gods, or God, or the Eternal wisdom) must be the cornerstone of law leads the trio, naturally, into the framing of religious laws. The laws proposed by Cicero seem to draw mostly from even then antique statutes from Rome's earliest days, including those of Numa Pompilius, the semi-legendary second king of Rome and the laws of the Twelve Tables, according to Quintus. From thence follows a long discussion on the merits of Cicero's hypothetical decrees.

Among the things acknowledged in this section are the fact that at times religious laws have both a spiritual and a pragmatic purpose, as Cicero, when quoting the laws of the Twelve Tables and their injunction against burial or cremation within the pomerium, admits that the injunction is as much to appease fate (by not burying the dead where the living dwell) as it is to avoid calamity (by lessening the risk of fire in the city due to open-pyre cremation). After the discussions on religious laws, and with Cicero's stated objective to replicate Plato's feat by conducting a thorough discussion on the laws in one day, they move into civil law and the makeup of the government.

Book Three 

Book Three, where the manuscript breaks off, is Cicero's enumeration of the set up of the government, as opposed to the religious laws of the previous book, that he would advocate as the basis for his reformed Roman state.

Outline of Cicero's proposed constitution 
 The Judicial System Cicero, who believed that the trial courts as he had seen them were too open to tampering through bribery or through sharp practice (as he had himself experienced and thwarted in the case of Gaius Verres), would place the trials back in the hands of the people at large, with the Comitia Centuriata trying cases where the penalty was death or exile, and the Concilium Plebis trying all other cases. A magistrate (Praetor or even Consul) would still preside over the trial.  That same magistrate would then, upon a guilty verdict, impose a punishment unless a majority of the relevant assembly disagreed. During military campaigns, unlike in civilian trials, Cicero would remove the right of appeal from those convicted of wrongdoing.
 The Senate, in Cicero's laws, would no longer exist as merely an advisory body, but would now hold actual legislative authority, and their decrees would be binding.  Any former magistrate has the right to enter the Senate.  In a later portion of the dialogue, Cicero defends the apparent democracy of the change by arguing that the quasi-aristocratic Senate would serve as a counterbalance to the populist and democratic popular assemblies. Further, Cicero would impose a stipulation that only those with thoroughly unblemished behavior and reputations could remain in the order — the Censors could remove those who misbehaved at will.  It was Cicero's stated hope that such a reformed Senate could serve as an example for the rest of the Roman state of probity, harmony, common interest and fair play. Acquisitiveness and greed in the Senate were to be severely punished, apparently, by Cicero's laws. This was not so much to punish the greed itself, but because greed in the Senate bred greed and dissent among the Romans.  "If you're prepared to go back over the records of history, it is plain that the state has taken its character from that of its foremost men." (III.31)
 The two Consuls, the Praetor, the Dictator, the Master of the Horse (his lieutenant), election officers and the tribunes would have the right to preside over Senate meetings. However, such meetings were to be held in what Cicero characterized as a "quiet, disciplined manner".
 Senators must also, by Cicero's hypothetical law, be current in important affairs of state whether or not it is the particular Senator's bailiwick.
 Magistrates The basic outline of Roman society was to be kept (in keeping with Cicero's basic conservatism) but reforms to the structure were in his plan to prevent or reverse the decay of the state. From low to high, the proposed magistrates in Cicero's reformed Republic seem to be:
Quaestors, still with the power of the purse as normal, with the exception that Quaestorhood would no longer be the first step on the cursus honorum
A new magistrate who would be responsible for the safety of prisoners and the executing of sentences (he may have meant a normalization of the triumviri capitales as an elected magisterial post)
Minters and moneyers (again, a reform of the triumviri monetales)
An expansion, apparently, of the Board of Ten for Deciding Cases (or decemviri stlitibus iudicandis), whose purview would have been more than the citizenship and freedom/slavery cases they then judged (Cicero does not seem to elaborate — it may have been in the lost portion of the work)
Aediles, who were still responsible for public works and welfare, and who would thenceforth be the first step on Cicero's reformed cursus honorum
 Censors, who, while holding their traditional post (conducting the census and permitting or denying membership in the Senatorial Order and otherwise ordering society), would now be a normalized elected post with the usual restriction of having been a former consul apparently removed. The Censors would also have the task of interpreting laws.  
 At the end of a magistrate's tenure, he was to give a full account to the Censor of his actions in office, whereupon the Censor would judge his fitness to remain in the Senatorial Order. This did not absolve him from prosecution for his actions.
 A Praetor, responsible for civil cases and lawsuits. Along with him would be an indeterminate number of equally-empowered officials (although most likely under his direction — again, Cicero does not elaborate overmuch) appointed by the Senate or popular assemblies. 
 At the same time, any magistrate could preside over a trial and conduct auspices.
 At the top would be the two Consuls, as always, with split royal power. All of these posts would be filled for terms of one year, except the Censors, which would be a five-year tenure. No person would be eligible to run for the same office twice in ten years. All age restrictions as then-currently existing for the posts would remain in force.
 Should the state be in extremis, the Senate could appoint a dictator, who would, as in years past, be allowed a six-month term of unlimited imperium and who would appoint a lieutenant in charge of cavalry Magister Equitum who would also function as Praetor.
 Cicero would also leave in place the ten Tribunes of the Plebeians, with their full powers of veto, and would still be sacrosanct. The Tribunes of the People would also be permitted to preside over meetings of the Senate.
 Quintus, later in the dialogue, strongly objected to this, feeling that the Tribunes, as currently constituted, were a destabilizing force in the state, and believed that Cicero should have rolled back their powers to their severely curtailed state under the laws of Sulla. Cicero seems to argue that curtailing the power of the plebeians or giving them a sham representation of a share in government would be even more destabilizing than a potential Tiberius Gracchus or Saturninus could be. To do so, he in effect argues, would create the same Saturninii and Gracchi that Sulla's laws tried to halt. Cicero remarks: "I admit there is an element of evil inherent in the office of tribune; but without that evil we would not have the good which was the point of setting it up. 'The plebeian tribunes,' you say, 'have too much power.' Who's arguing with that? But the crude power of the people is much more savage and violent. By having a leader, it is sometimes milder than if it had none." (III:23) (from The Oxford World Classics translation by Niall Rudd)
 Should both consuls, or the Dictator, die or otherwise leave office, all other current officials from quaestor on up are removed from office. An interrex would be appointed by the Senate to arrange as soon as practicable new elections.
 Popular Assemblies: The People's Assemblies were, by law, to be free of violence, and were also legislative assemblies. In both the Senate and people's assemblies, a magistrate of a higher rank than the one presiding would be able to veto any act.
 Voting and Laws Ballots were, due to an epidemic in Cicero's time of vote tampering and bribery, not to be secret, so that they could be immediately examined for voter fraud.  There was also a measure of elitism in his proposal as well, however — if the people did not know how the upper classes had voted, Cicero thought they would be confused as to which way to vote.
 No laws were to be passed that were meant to target an individual (no doubt, this was in response to the law pushed through by Publius Clodius Pulcher in 58 BC that demanded exile for any magistrate who imposed and executed a death sentence without a vote by the Popular Assemblies — a clear reference to Cicero, who had done just that in 63 BC in response to the Catilinarian Conspiracy) 
 No magistrate could impose capital punishment or revocation of citizenship without a vote of the Comitia Centuriata
 Bribery or seeking bribes were to be punished severely.
 Laws would be kept in official record form, something that Cicero felt had lapsed.

After a discussion and debate between Cicero and Quintus about the Consuls and the voting rights of citizens, the manuscript breaks off.

Provenance of the text 
Much like its sister work de re publica, de Legibus exists in fragmentary condition, with no work beyond the first half of Book Three known to survive. The remaining fragments of de Legibus are scattered in three volumes at the Leiden University Library.

Further, issues of legibility and authenticity have been raised among researchers. Vienna Professor M. Zelzer in 1981 argued that the text as it is now known may have been transcribed out of a cursive (as opposed to block-text) copy at some point, incurring possible mistakes from the vagaries of the script. Others (such as translator Niall Rudd) argue that the text was still in rough-draft form at the time of Cicero's murder in December 43 BC, and that it was still to be cleaned up and edited by the author. Much like de re publica, some material was recovered from the writings of others. Two passages were found used in the third- and fourth-century writer Lactantius's Divinae Institutiones (Lactantius also quoted heavily from de re publica), and one further paragraph has been located in Macrobius' Saturnalia.

Quotes
 Let the punishment fit the offense. [noxiae poena par esto.] (III, 11)

Text and translations
 TVLLI CICERONIS DE LEGIBVS LIBRI TRES
 Free Audiobook version of De Legibus translated by Charles Duke Yonge
 English text on google books

References

External links

 

Books in political philosophy
Philosophical works by Cicero
Political thought in ancient Rome
Roman Republic
1st-century BC Latin books